Orta Xuç (also, Orta Xuc and Orta Khuch) is a village in the Quba Rayon of Azerbaijan.  The village forms part of the municipality of Aşağı Xuç.

References

External links

Populated places in Quba District (Azerbaijan)